Attia Hamouda (1914 – 1992) was a lightweight (60-67.5 kg) on the Egyptian weightlifting team at the 1948 Summer Olympics in London. He earned a silver medal for Egypt after lifting a record of 360 kg. He lost to his team mate Ibrahim Shams, who lifted the same weight but was lighter. This was the second time that Egypt accumulated five medals, having also done so at the 1936 Summer Olympics.

References

External links 
Attia Hamouda's profile at Sports Reference.com
Attia Hamouda's profile at the Egyptian Ministry for Youth and Sport

See also 
 List of Egyptians

1914 births
1992 deaths
Egyptian male weightlifters
Olympic weightlifters of Egypt
Weightlifters at the 1948 Summer Olympics
Olympic silver medalists for Egypt
Olympic medalists in weightlifting
Medalists at the 1948 Summer Olympics
20th-century Egyptian people